The Classic FM Hall of Fame is an annual compilation of the most popular 300 classical works as polled by listeners of Classic FM through a public vote. With more than 200,000 voters, each choosing their three favourites in order of preference, Classic FM claim their Hall of Fame is the world's most comprehensive poll of classical music tastes.

The chart countdown is traditionally broadcast over the Easter weekend, extended by public holidays in the UK, since the event began in 1996.

The compilation is notable for featuring a wide variety of classical works. Pieces by composers such as Elgar and Beethoven feature alongside works by contemporary composers such as Karl Jenkins and Ludovico Einaudi. Movie soundtracks by John Williams, John Barry and Ennio Morricone are also regular features of the chart. And, for the first time in 2012, the chart featured two original works from video game soundtracks.

In 2015, 12 pieces of music from video game soundtracks were voted into Classic FM's top 300 chart.

Current top twenty
The current top twenty was revealed on 18 April 2022.

 1. Ralph Vaughan Williams – The Lark Ascending
 2. Sergei Rachmaninoff – Piano Concerto No. 2
 3. Ralph Vaughan Williams – Fantasia on a Theme by Thomas Tallis
 4. Debbie Wiseman – The Glorious Garden
 5. Edward Elgar – Enigma Variations
 6. Gustav Holst – The Planets
 7. Ludwig van Beethoven – Piano Concerto No. 5 ('Emperor')
 8. Antonio Vivaldi – The Four Seasons
 9. Ludwig van Beethoven – Symphony No. 9 ('Choral')
 10. John Williams – Schindler's List
 11. Ludwig van Beethoven – Symphony No. 6 ('Pastoral') 
 12. Antonin Dvořák – New World Symphony
 13. Wolfgang Amadeus Mozart – Requiem 
 14. Pyotr Ilyich Tchaikovsky – 1812 Overture 
 15. Wolfgang Amadeus Mozart – Clarinet Concerto  
 16. Edward Elgar – Cello Concerto 
 17. Karl Jenkins – The Armed Man  
 18. Jean Sibelius – Finlandia
 19. Ludwig van Beethoven – Symphony No. 7
 20. George Gershwin – Rhapsody in Blue

Previous top three

Source

Criticism and controversy
The Hall of Fame reflects voter preferences, rather than public purchases of recordings, so there has been a lack of variation at the top of the chart. The pieces that make up the top ten have changed very little since the chart began. Only five different pieces have ever held the number one position.

2013 provided the most controversial Hall of Fame to date as a result of an organised voting campaign concerning video game soundtracks by UK based games promoter Mark Robins. Several video game soundtracks were voted into the 2013 Hall of Fame, with the highest being Nobuo Uematsu's music for Final Fantasy at number three. This led to more than 200,000 votes being cast, the highest in the chart's history. John Suchet stated that he was "delighted that we've attracted so many votes for our chart" and that what he finds "truly exciting is the continued increase in a younger audience for classical music - I didn't expect to be thanking the video game industry for introducing the genre to a new generation of people, but it's wonderful."

References

External links
 The 2021 Hall of Fame
 The 2020 Hall of Fame

British record charts
Classical music in the United Kingdom
Halls of fame in the United Kingdom
Music halls of fame
1996 establishments in the United Kingdom
Recurring events established in 1996
Annual events in the United Kingdom
Classic FM (UK)